The Velocette MSS is a motorcycle made by Velocette. It was fast, reliable and economical but could not compete against a new range of British twin-cylinder motorcycles. Production ended in 1968.

Development
It was launched in 1935 as a 500cc to the new m series models, intended as a side car hauler.  World War II halted production which did not resume until 1954. The new MSS was a much more modern machine with the same frame as the Velocette MAC and was fitted with sidecar lugs and had optional panniers to appeal to the touring market. Buyers started tuning the MSS for speed, however, and the factory responded by producing the sports Velocette Venom model. In 1955 a scrambles version was also produced.

Racing history
Burt Munro from New Zealand, featured in the film The World's Fastest Indian raced a heavily modified 1936 Velocette MSS. Racing preparation included making special pistons, changing the frame and increasing engine capacity to 650 cc.

References

MSS